Family Ties is a 1980s American TV sitcom.

Family Ties may also refer to:

Arts, entertainment and media

Music
 Family Ties (Daddy X album), 2006
 Family Ties (Fat Joe and Dre album), 2018
 Family Ties, by Chillinit, 2021
 "Family Ties" (song), by Baby Keem and Kendrick Lamar, 2021

Films
 Family Ties (2006 film), 2006 South Korean film
 Family Ties (2018 film), 2018 Canadian film

Novels
 Family Ties (novel), 2010 novel by Danielle Steel
 Family Ties (short story collection), 1960 book by Clarice Lispector

Television episodes
 "Family Ties" (Arrested Development)
 "Family Ties" (Bakugan Battle Brawlers: New Vestroia)
 "Family Ties" (The Bill)
 "Family Ties" (Blue Bloods)
 "Family Ties" (Crossing Jordan)
 "Family Ties" (Dangerous Minds)
 "Family Ties" (Farscape)
 "Family Ties" (NYPD Blue)
 "The Family Ties", The O.C.
 "Family Ties" (Parental Guidance)
 "Family Ties" (Renegade)
 "Family Ties" (Stargate SG-1)
 "Family Ties" (Stormworld)
 "Family Ties: Part I" (Third Watch)
 "Family Ties: Part II" (Third Watch)
 "Family Ties" (The Upper Hand)
 "Family Ties" (The Vampire Diaries)
 "Family Ties" (Whistler)
 "Family Ties" (X-Men)

Other uses
 X-wing Rogue Squadron: Family Ties, 1998 story arc in the comics series X-wing: Rogue Squadron

See also 
 Family — Ties of Blood, a 2006 Hindi film
 Kinship (disambiguation)